Robinson Hollow is a valley in Reynolds County in the U.S. state of Missouri.

Robinson Hollow has the name of the local Robinson family.

References

Valleys of Reynolds County, Missouri
Valleys of Missouri